Eastern Connecticut State University (Eastern, Eastern Connecticut, Eastern Connecticut State, or ECSU) is a public liberal arts university in Willimantic, Connecticut. Founded in 1889, it is the second-oldest campus in the Connecticut State University System and third-oldest public university in the state. Eastern is located on Windham Street in Willimantic, Connecticut, on  30 minutes from Hartford, lying midway between New York City and Boston. Although the majority of courses are held on the main campus, select classes take place at Manchester Community College, Capital Community College, and a satellite center in Groton.

Eastern Connecticut State University is a member of the Connecticut State Colleges & Universities.

History
The Connecticut General Assembly established the Willimantic State Normal School in 1889. As a normal school, the institution trained schoolteachers. The first class was of thirteen female students, who attended classes on the third floor of the Willimantic Savings Institute. The first male student entered in 1893.

In 1890, the Town of Windham deeded  to the State of Connecticut for construction of a new campus for the school. The larger campus was completed in 1895. The first dormitory, Burr Hall, opened in September 1921. The institution was renamed Willimantic State Teachers College in 1937, after it began granting bachelor's degrees. The original Normal School building was destroyed in a fire and replaced by Shafer Hall, which was dedicated in 1946.

The State College created its first graduate program (in education) in 1953. After expanding its programs and campus, it became Eastern Connecticut State College in 1967, and Eastern Connecticut State University in 1983.

Academics

Academically, the university is organized into three schools, the School of Arts and Sciences, the School of Education and Professional Studies, and the School of Continuing Education. Graduate study programs offered through the School of Education and Professional Studies and include Education, Teacher Certification, and Organizational Management.

Institute for Sustainable Energy
The Institute for Sustainable Energy was opened in 2001 and focuses on sustainable energy education, serving as a source for sustainable energy information, assistance in sustainable energy policy making, and assistance in implementing sustainable energy solutions. The institute is located at 182 High Street. The current director is William Leahy.

In 2012 Eastern had a stationary phosphoric acid fuel cell, known as the PureCell System Model 400, installed on the west side of its Science Building. Eastern will use 100 percent of the energy produced by the fuel cell system to provide a majority of the power required for the Science Building, while maximizing the use of the heat output available. Under a 10-year Energy Services Agreement (ESA) with ClearEdge Power, the installation was made possible by a federal American Recovery and Reinvestment Act (ARRA) grant through CEFIA.

Housing
87 percent of first-year students, and 60 percent of all full-time undergraduates live in college housing. The campus is separated into first-year halls and upperclassman halls. All students with sophomore status and higher are eligible to live in upperclassman halls. There are six first-year halls, five upperclassman halls and two sets of apartments.

Student organizations
Eastern offers more than 80 student organizations in which students can participate, including athletic, political, cultural, artistic and communication clubs. The campus newscast is ETV. The Student Government Association is the liaison between the student body and university administration and each residence hall has a student council that plans events and trips for hall residents.

Athletics

Eastern's sports teams are known as the "Warriors" and are represented by a logo depicting a shield superior to two crossed swords. The university is a member of the NCAA Division III, the Little East Conference and the Eastern College Athletic Conference. Men's varsity sports include baseball, basketball, cross country, lacrosse, soccer, and indoor and outdoor track and field. Women's varsity sports include basketball, cross country, field hockey, lacrosse, soccer, softball, swimming, indoor and outdoor track and field, and volleyball.

Intramural sports include men's and women's tennis league, co-ed indoor and outdoor soccer, co-ed dodgeball, men's and women's flag football, men's and women's volleyball, co-ed softball, ultimate frisbee league, men's and women's basketball league, co-ed floor hockey, wiffle ball tournament, golf. Club sports include competitive cheerleading, fencing club, football club, ice hockey club and rugby club.

The men's baseball team won the NCAA Division III national championship five times (1982, '90, '98, '02, '22). The women's softball team won national championships five times (1981 (AIAW Div. III), '82, '85, '86, and '90 − NCAA).

Campus
South Campus is the historic part of the university and includes buildings such as Burr Hall, the school's first dormitory, which dates back to 1921. North Campus, the more modern part of the university, is home to the library, the fine arts instructional center, and the student center.

Notable alumni
Chimamanda Ngozi Adichie - Nigerian writer
Pat Boyd – Connecticut State Representative
Christopher D. Coutu - Former Connecticut State Representative
William A. Cugno - Adjutant General of the Connecticut National Guard
Edward Gaffney - Michigan State Representative 
David W. Gay - Adjutant General of the Connecticut National Guard
Camille Kostek - model who was on the cover of Sports Illustrated Swimsuit Issue
Victoria Leigh Soto - Sandy Hook Elementary School teacher killed in the massacre
Susan Wilson - Author

See also
Connecticut State University System
WECS

References

External links
Official website

 
Public universities and colleges in Connecticut
Educational institutions established in 1889
Willimantic, Connecticut
Universities and colleges in Windham County, Connecticut
Liberal arts colleges in Connecticut
1889 establishments in Connecticut
Public liberal arts colleges in the United States